Kamyshlu is the name of two towns in Armenia:
Kamyshlu, Armavir
Kamyshlu, Gegharkunik